"Strawberry Wine" is a song written by Matraca Berg and Gary Harrison, and recorded by American country music artist Deana Carter. It was released in August 1996 as Carter's debut single and the first from her debut album Did I Shave My Legs for This?.  The song also became Carter's first number 1 hit on both the US Billboard Hot Country Singles & Tracks (now Hot Country Songs) chart and the Canadian RPM Country Tracks.

"Strawberry Wine" is Carter's most successful single overall, and is considered a signature song both for her and for songwriter Matraca Berg.

Content
"Strawberry Wine" is a sentimental ballad, backed primarily with steel guitar and percussion. The narrator describes a time in her youth when she lost her innocence, and compares her love to the sweetness of "strawberry wine". As she grows older, she returns to this place, to find that everything has changed. Carter originally performed this song in the key of D-flat major with a vocal range of A3-D5. It has a 6/8 time signature and the main chord pattern is D-G-D-A-D.

The song tells the story of co-writer Berg's own coming of age as a teenager outside of Luck, Wisconsin, she recalled: "We used to go to my grandparents' dairy farm in the summer. My aunt, who's six months younger than me, and I would try to score some wine. And I met this boy..." The song references Boone’s Farm Strawberry Wine, an inexpensive and sweet wine favored by teenagers at the time according to Matraca. The song was written in less than four hours. As the narrator remembers a summer spent on her grandparents farm, she nostalgically recalls herself as being naive and youthful in pursuit of experiencing love, metaphorically comparing her first love to strawberry wine, considered to be sweet and intoxicating, but ultimately bittersweet in aftertaste. The song Strawberry Wine was shopped around the country music circuit for a period of time, and was passed upon by multiple artists, including Trisha Yearwood. Berg shopped the song to record labels around Nashville, but consensus mistakenly considered it overly long, controversial due to its reference to a teenage girl losing her virginity, and "not memorable enough."  Matraca first performed the song for her publisher Pat Higdon at a tent showcase. The showcase was held for representatives of music labels and artists to listen to the new works of Higdon’s writers. Matraca looked at the floor the entire time she performed the work, only looking up when concluding the song to see that Pat was, “grinning from ear to ear.” Deanna Carter was the only artist that attended the showcase, and she wanted the song for her record. Deana recorded Strawberry Wine for her debut album, Did I Shave My Legs for This?.

Critical reception
"Strawberry Wine" won Song of the Year at the Country Music Association Awards in 1997 and was voted Song of the Year by the Nashville Songwriters Association International and the Nashville Music Awards. That year, the song was also nominated for three additional awards; Grammy Award for Best Country Song, Academy of Country Music Awards Best Country Song nominee, and Country Music Radio Awards for Song of The Year.

Commercial performance
"Strawberry Wine" debuted at number 70 on the U.S. Billboard Hot Country Singles & Tracks for the chart week of August 17, 1996. The song reached Number One on the chart in November 1996, holding the position for two weeks. The song has sold 870,000 digital copies in the US as of October 2015.

Music video

A music video was released for "Strawberry Wine", directed by Roger Pistole. The location for the music video was discovered by location scout Chris Farren, who recalled being driven through Guthrie, Kentucky by his parents as a child along Highway 41, the Dixie-Beeline Highway. Chris approached the owners of Old Oaks Farm unannounced, which was at that time owned by John & Kathy Hansen to request to film on site of the historic mansion and farm. A few days later, the film crew and Deana Carter arrived on site at the farm to film. The filming of the video was difficult for the crew as the weather was uncooperative, raining during many of the takes causing the storyline to be drastically altered and the film shots to be edited substantially with filters. The entire video is shot at Old Oaks Farm and within less than a one-mile vicinity of the farm. 

In the music video, scenes vary between Deana Carter singing "Strawberry Wine" alongside vignettes of reenactments inspired by the lyrics of the song. Deana is seen in the video while standing in central hall of Old Oaks mansion adjacent to the mansion's newel post, in the parlor on the mansion's camelback sofa, on the central hall stair landing, at the facade entry, and behind the mansion's south facing side porch screen door, in the adjacent fields in front of a nearby hay storage barn located west of the mansion, and in the front yard rope swing. 

Accompanying the scenes of Deana are actors portraying the song's narrator in two time periods, and the narrator's grandparents who are described in the lyrics as owning the farm on which the young love affair takes place. 

The young couple are first seen resting on the porch of Old Oaks mansion, in a nearby tree swing, driving down a rural country road (actual location: Fairgrounds Road) in a 1971 rally sport Chevrolet Camaro, and sitting on the railroad tracks at a CSX Railroad train yard located one mile south of Old Oaks Farm. 

The senior couple depicts the narrator's grandparents. The elderly couple are seen sitting on the mansion's porch, the grandfather with a violin in his hands and his wife rocking in a porch rocking chair. The elderly couple is seen running through the gardens of the Old Oaks mansion while holding hands, and in the soybean fields surrounding the mansion. 

The song's coda depicts the narrator imagining herself returning to the farm in her middle-aged years while at the rope swing and on the rural road. Thereafter she imagines a requited love in which the she and her former love interest are together. This middle-aged couple is seen in vignettes throughout the farm, including standing in front of the farm's hay storage barns and adjacent to the mansion's garden fence. 

Old Oaks Farm is also a setting of the poem "True Love," written by the United States' first Poet Laureate Robert Penn Warren. Today, the farm is owned by Emily Riggins Humphreys, the wife of the late founder of Humphreys and Partners Architects. The mansion is open to the public as a lodging and events venue.

Charts

Year-end charts

Certifications

References

1996 debut singles
1996 songs
Deana Carter songs
Songs written by Matraca Berg
Songs written by Gary Harrison
Song recordings produced by Chris Farren (country musician)
Songs about alcohol
Country ballads
Capitol Records Nashville singles
1990s ballads